Aftermath is a 1994 Spanish horror short film written and directed by Nacho Cerdà. Containing no spoken dialogue, Aftermath is the second installment in a trilogy of shorts by Cerdà, preceded by 1990's The Awakening, and followed by 1998's Genesis.

Plot 
A woman named Marta Arnau Marti dies in a car crash, after accidentally running over a dog. An orderly wheels Marta's body into a morgue drawer, past a mourning couple, who a nurse gives a crucifix necklace. The orderly overhears two workers performing autopsies on a pair of male bodies, looks in on them out of curiosity and leaves when one of the morticians (who is disturbingly enthused by his duties) glares at him. The morticians complete their work on the dead men, and while one leaves, the other remains, and brings in Marta's body.

Aroused by Marta, the mortician locks himself in the morgue with her body, undresses it, removes the brain, and caresses it with a knife, which he uses to mutilate Marta's vagina, and cut open her torso. The mortician masturbates to orgasm while fondling Marta's breasts and innards, then takes photographs of his handiwork. Unable to contain his lust any longer, the mortician engages in necrophilia, after setting his camera on automatic to record the event.

Afterward, the mortician autopsies Marta, cleans up and leaves. In his home, the pajama-clad mortician blends Marta's stolen heart into a pulp, which he gives to his dog before proceeding to relax in his sitting room. As a baby's cries emanate from the television, the scraps of the newspaper the dog is eating the heart off of are shown to contain Marta's obituary.

Cast 
 Pep Tosar as Forensic
 Jordi Tarrida as Medic #2
 Ángel Tarris as Celador
 Xevi Collellmir as Vin Carcass

Release

Home media
Aftermath was released on DVD by Unearthed Films on August 23, 2005; as a double-feature alongside its sequel Genesis (1998). It was later released by Anthem Pictures on February 27, 2007. This release would also include the film's sequel as a double-feature.

Reception

Critical reception for Aftermath has been mixed to positive, with some critics praising the film for its unflinching attention to detail, while others criticized the film for those same merits.

Dread Central wrote, "It is intense. It is unflinching. Yet, at its core it is subtle, hauntingly beautiful, and every bit as rich in detail and composition as any other great film has ever been." DVD Talk awarded four and a half out of five stars and wrote, "The necrophilia in this movie is very disturbing. It is not just carnal; it is filled with volatility and extreme violence. While nothing is shown outright, the implication is repellent enough. Indeed, one could argue that Cerdà is making a larger point about defying death. But it's a hard sell. Treating the departed as nothing more than a plaything for the fulfillment of one's most twisted desires almost erases any grander theme. While the ending is quite unnerving, the rest of Aftermath is an equally uneasy ordeal. You may see nothing more in it than fetishism gone foul, however. Or you may see something very insightful.  Bloody Disgusting rated it four and half out of five stars and wrote, "Aftermath, is definitely one of the most controversial films of the last couple of decades. Its ruthless and realistic depiction of grisly autopsies and a sinister surgeon with an inclination towards violent necrophilia has some of the hardest scenes to stomach in any horror movie, period."

Awards and nominations
Aftermath won in the category "Best Short Film" at the 1997 Fantasia Festival.

References

External links 
 
 
 

1994 films
1994 independent films
1994 horror films
Films about death
Films set in 1994
Films set in Spain
Films shot in Spain
Films without speech
Medical-themed films
Necrophilia in film
Spanish splatter films
Body horror films
Spanish horror films
Spanish independent films
Spanish short films